The 1989 South African Professional Championship was a non-ranking snooker tournament, which took place in January 1989.
The tournament featured eleven South African players.

Perrie Mans won the title, beating Robbie Grace 8–5 in the final.

Main draw

References

South African Professional Championship
South African Professional Championship
South African Professional Championship
South African Professional Championship